Arena is an active protection system (APS) developed at Russia's Kolomna-based Engineering Design Bureau for the purpose of protecting armoured fighting vehicles from destruction by light anti-tank weapons, anti-tank guided missiles (ATGM), and missiles with top attack warheads. It uses a Doppler radar to detect incoming warheads. Upon detection, a defensive rocket is fired that detonates near the inbound threat, destroying it before it hits the vehicle.

Arena is the successor to Drozd, a Soviet active protection system from the late 1970s, which was installed on several T-55s during the Soviet–Afghan War. The system improved the vehicle's survivability rate, increasing it by up to 80%. Drozd was followed by Shtora in the late 1980s, which used an electro-optical dazzlers or expendable so (smoke/IR smoke) to confuse the seeker head or defeat the user. In late 1994 the Russian Army deployed many armoured fighting vehicles to Chechnya, where they were ambushed and suffered heavy casualties. The effectiveness of Chechen rocket-propelled grenades against Russian combat vehicles prompted the Kolomenskoye machine-building design bureau to devise the Arena active protection system in the early and mid-1990s. An export variant, Arena-E, was also developed. The system has been tested on the T-80UM-1, demonstrated at Omsk in 1997, and was considered for use on the South Korean K2 Black Panther main battle tank.

Background
The Soviet Union developed the first active protection system between 1977 and 1982, named Drozd (Russian: Дрозд). This system was designed as an alternative to passive or reactive armour, to defend against enemy anti-tank weapons. The system's development was stimulated in large part by the introduction of new high-explosive anti-tank warheads. Drozd was designed to destroy these warheads before they hit the armour of a vehicle being attacked. It was composed of three main parts: two launcher arrays placed on either side of the gun turret and an auxiliary power unit located to the rear of the turret. The arrays were controlled by two millimeter-wave radar antennae. Drozd could protect a tank between the elevations of −6 and 20 degrees along the vertical plane, and between 40 and 60 degrees along the horizontal plane. Although reported to offer an 80% increase in survival rate during its testing in Afghanistan, the radar was unable to adequately detect threats and the firing of its rockets caused unacceptably high levels of collateral damage. About 250 Drozd systems were manufactured, all of which were installed on T-55s belonging to the Soviet Union's naval infantry.

In the late 1980s, the Soviet Army began development of the Shtora-1 electro-optical jammer. It was first mounted on a T-80U in 1989, and later showcased on a T-72B (renamed T-72BU and later T-90). Shtora-1 is designed to jam incoming anti-tank missiles using a one-kilowatt infrared radiator. In 1995, it was fitted on a Ukrainian T-84. The Shtora-1 system consists of an infra-red radiator interface station, composed of the jammer, modulator and control panel, a number of forward-firing grenade discharges capable of producing a smoke screen, a laser warning receiver and a general control panel. Shtora offers 360 degree all-around protection, between the elevations of −5 and 25 degrees. The system is activated when the laser warning system alerts the tank commander, who responds by pressing a button on his control panel which automatically orients the turret towards the threat. This triggers the grenade launch, creating a smoke screen to reduce the ability of the missile to lock-on the vehicle. The jammers are designed to jam the infra-red seekers on the inbound missiles. According to the manufacturers, Shtora decreases the chances of a tank being hit by an anti-tank missile, such as the Dragon, by a factor of 4–5:1.

The large number of Russia's casualties during the First Chechen War prompted Russia to consider the development of a new active protection system. During the Battle of Grozny, for example, the Russian Army lost between 200 and 250 armoured fighting vehicles to Chechen rebels. Vehicles which were knocked-out included main battle tanks such as the T-72 and T-80, and lighter armoured vehicles such as the BMP-2. The majority of tanks deployed to Chechnya were not issued with explosive reactive armour, due to the "lack of time and funds", while some of those that were issued with reactive armour did not have the explosive charge to start the reaction. Some of the most dangerous threats to Russian armour were rocket-propelled grenades fired from buildings in Grozny. As a result of these vulnerabilities, Kolomenskoye developed the Arena active protection system, with the goal of providing Russian armour more reliable protection against these threats.

System details
The Arena system was primarily designed to defeat threats such as the rocket propelled grenade and the anti-tank missile, including newer anti-tank missiles with longer ranges. The active protection system can protect against missiles fired from both infantry carried rocket launchers and from helicopters, which attack the vehicle directly or by overflying it. Modern rocket propelled grenades can penetrate almost  of steel armour, posing a serious threat to tanks operating in environments of asymmetric warfare. Therefore, increased tank protection requires either an increase in armour thickness and weight, or alternatively the use of an active protection system, like Arena.

The system uses a multi-function Doppler radar, which can be turned on and off by the tank commander. In conjunction with radar input, a digital computer scans an arc around the tank for threats, and evaluates which of the tank's 26 quick-action projectiles it will release to intercept the incoming threat. In selecting the projectile to use for defeating the threat, the ballistic computer employs the information processed by the radar, including information such as flight parameters and velocity. The computer has a reaction time of 0.05 seconds and protects the tank over a 300-degree arc, everywhere but the rear side of the turret. Arena works during the day and night, and the lack of electromagnetic interference allows the system to be used by multiple vehicles as a team. Arena increases a tank's probability of surviving a rocket-propelled grenade by between 1.5–2 times.

Shtora was a soft-kill system, designed to passively defeat anti-tank missiles by jamming their guidance systems.  By contrast, Arena is a hard-kill system like Drozd, designed to destroy the warhead through the use of munitions before the missile can engage the vehicle being protected.

Deployment
The Arena active protection system was first tested at the Kubinka proving grounds in early 1995, successfully defending a Russian tank against an anti-tank guided missile. A Russian T-80UM-1, with Arena, was demonstrated to the public at Omsk in late 1997. Arena was also mounted on the BMP-3M modernization package, developed by the Kurganmashzavod Joint Stock Company, although the package has received no export orders.

An export variant, named Arena-E (Арена-Э), is available, worth an estimated $300,000. According to Russia, it was selected to be used on the South Korean K2 main battle tank, although this was not confirmed by South Korea.

Notes

References

 
 
 
 
 
 
 
 
 
 

Armoured fighting vehicle equipment
Weapons countermeasures
Land active protection systems